Tshabong Airport , also known as Tsabong Airport, is an airport serving Tsabong, a town in the Kgalagadi District of Botswana.

See also

Transport in Botswana
List of airports in Botswana

References

External links
OpenStreetMap - Tshabong
OurAirports - Tshabong
Fallingrain - Tshabong Airport

Airports in Botswana